102 Dalmatians is a 2000 American crime comedy film directed by Kevin Lima and produced by Edward S. Feldman and Walt Disney Pictures. The sequel to the 1996 film 101 Dalmatians, a live-action remake of the 1961 Disney animated film of the same name, it stars Glenn Close reprising her role as Cruella de Vil as she attempts to steal puppies for her "grandest" fur coat yet. Glenn Close and Tim McInnerny were the only two actors from the 1996 film to return for the sequel. The film received generally negative reviews from critics and was unable to achieve the box office success of its predecessor, although the film was nominated for the Academy Award for Best Costume Design.

A reboot film in its own continuity, Cruella, was released on May 28, 2021, with Emma Stone in the title role and Close acting as an executive producer.

Plot
After three years in prison, Cruella de Vil has been cured of her desire for fur coats by Dr. Pavlov. She is released on probation but warned that if she breaks parole she will be immediately sent back to prison, as well as be forced to pay the remainder of her fortune, some eight million pounds, to all the dog shelters in Westminster. Cruella, therefore, mends her working relationship with her much-abused valet Alonzo and has him lock away all her fur coats, including her sketch of a dalmatian fur coat. Cruella's probation officer, Chloe Simon, is the owner of Dipstick (one of the original 101, bought from the Dalmatian Plantation of Roger and Anita Dearly); she suspects Cruella will strike again.

Dipstick's mate, Dottie, gives birth to three puppies: Domino, Little Dipper, and Oddball, who appears to be an albino, and begins to feel self-conscious about her lack of spots as she grows up.  Cruella buys the Second Chance Dog shelter, owned by Kevin Shepherd, and saves it from insolvency, to restore her reputation. Meanwhile, Dr. Pavlov discovers that when his therapy patients are subjected to loud bell noises, they revert to their former personalities, but he conceals these findings from the public. Inevitably, when Big Ben rings in her presence, Cruella reverts to her former personality. She enlists the help of French furrier Jean-Pierre LePelt to steal Dalmatian puppies for a new fur coat with a hood, explicitly modifying the original design to use Dipstick's children. 

Chloe and Kevin go out on a date while their dogs stay home. Kevin tells Chloe that, if Cruella violates her parole, her entire fortune will go to him, since his dog shelter is the only one currently operating in Westminster. Knowing this, Cruella has Kevin framed for the theft of the first ninety-nine puppies LePelt takes, also exploiting the fact that Kevin has a prior record of dog-napping. She invites Chloe and Dipstick to her house for a dinner party, to decoy them away while LePelt steals Dottie and her three puppies. Dipstick quickly returns to the apartment and hides in LePelt's truck but is later captured at the train station. Chloe rushes home to save her pets but arrives too late. She is joined by Kevin, who has escaped from prison with help from his dogs and talking macaw, Waddlesworth (who thinks he, too, is a dog). Kevin explains that his earlier conviction was for breaking animals out of a lab, where they were being used for experiments.

Upon finding LePelt's lost ticket for the Venice-Simplon Orient Express to Paris, Kevin and Chloe attempt and fail to stop Cruella and LePelt before they get on the train. Oddball and Waddlesworth manage to board the train, and Kevin and Chloe follow to Paris, where they are discovered and locked in a cellar. Despite this, they free the puppies through a hole in the ceiling. Cruella goes after the puppies alone, while Alonzo, having been mistreated beyond his patience, defeats LePelt and frees Kevin and Chloe. They pursue Cruella to a bakery and find that the puppies, led by Oddball, have tricked Cruella into being baked in an enormous cake. Cruella survives, then she and LePelt are both arrested.

Chloe and Kevin, exonerated from the theft accusation, return to London and are personally awarded the remnants of Cruella's fortune by Alonzo himself. Oddball's coat finally develops a few small spots, much to everyone's surprise.

Cast
 Glenn Close as Cruella de Vil
 Gérard Depardieu as Jean-Pierre LePelt
 Ioan Gruffudd as Kevin Shepherd
 Alice Evans as Chloe Simon
 Tim McInnerny as Alonzo
 Eric Idle as Waddlesworth the Red-and-green macaw
 Ben Crompton as Ewan
 Carol MacReady as Agnes Wilford 
 Jim Carter as Detective Armstrong 
 Ian Richardson as Mr. Torte QC
 David Horovitch as Dr. Pavlov
 Kerry Shale as Le Pelt's Assistant
 Ron Cook as Mr. Button
 Timothy West as Judge

Release
 On November 24, 1999, a teaser trailer was released with Disney/Pixar's Toy Story 2.
 On May 19, 2000, a second trailer was released with Dinosaur.

Production

The early working title was 101 Dalmatians Returns. Production began in December 1998 and ended in mid-November 1999 without the use of John Hughes who wrote and produced the 1996 film, due to the critical failure of Flubber and the shutdown of Great Oaks Entertainment. The film was set to be released on June 30, 2000, but was pushed back to November 22. The film's teaser was released on the same month the film came out in 1999, and shows stock footage from The Shawshank Redemption. Oxford Prison was used for the scene as Cruella walked out of prison. The teaser appeared in theaters before Toy Story 2 and Stuart Little. 102 Dalmatians was filmed partially in Paris. On November 7, Disney released the soundtrack to the movie, including pre-eminently, a cover of Paul Anka's "Puppy Love" (sung by Myra) and original songs:  Mike Himelstein's "What Can a Bird Do?" (voiced by Jeff Bennett), "My Spot in the World" (sung by Lauren Christy) and "Cruella De Vil 2000" (better known as "Cruella De Vil (102 Dalmatians)", sung by Camara Kambon and Mark Campbell of Jack Mack and the Heart Attack, a derivation of "Cruella de Vil").

The film is dedicated in memory of cameraman Mike Roberts, who died before it was released.

Reception

Box office
The film opened at the third position behind M. Night Shyamalan's Unbreakable and Ron Howard's Dr. Seuss' How the Grinch Stole Christmas. The film performed poorly at the box office, earning $67 million in the U.S. and $116.7 million in other territories, bringing its total to $183.6 million worldwide, grossing less than its predecessor.

Critical response
On Rotten Tomatoes, the film holds an approval rating of 31% based on 90 reviews, and an average rating of 4.42/10. The website's critics consensus reads: "This sequel to the live-action 101 Dalmatians is simply more of the same. Critics say it also drags in parts-- potentially boring children-- and that it's too violent for a G-rated movie." On Metacritic, the film has a weighted average score of 35 out of 100, based on 24 critics, indicating "generally unfavorable reviews". Audiences polled by CinemaScore gave the film an average grade of "B+" on an A+ to F scale.

Roger Ebert gave the film 2.5 out of 4, writing: "Glenn Close does what can be done with the role. Indeed, she does more than can be done; Cruella is almost too big for a live-action film and requires animation to fit her operatic scale."

Home media
102 Dalmatians was released on VHS and DVD on April 3, 2001. It was re-released on DVD on September 16, 2008.

Video game
A video game loosely based on the film, that was entitled Disney's 102 Dalmatians: Puppies to the Rescue, was released in 2000, with Frankie Muniz as the voice of Domino, Molly Marlette as the voice of Oddball and Susanne Blakeslee as the voice of Cruella de Vil. Horace and Jasper also appeared in the game despite not being present in the film.

Future

Reboot

A reboot film, centered around Cruella de Vil titled Cruella was in development. Glenn Close served as an executive producer on the project while Emma Stone played the eponymous role. The film was released on May 28, 2021.

A potential follow-up film to Cruella was discussed with Stone and Thompson mentioning the possibility of Close also appearing in a sequel with inspiration from The Godfather Part II.

Possible sequel
In May 2021, Glenn Close revealed that while working on Cruella as an executive producer, she wrote a new story as a sequel to the films where she would reprise the role of Cruella De Vil. The plot would involve the character in New York City, New York and also take inspiration from The Godfather Part II. The actress intends to pitch it to the studio.

References

External links

 
 
 
 
 

101 Dalmatians films
2000 films
2000 comedy films
2000s adventure comedy films
American adventure comedy films
American children's adventure films
American children's comedy films
American films about revenge
American sequel films
2000s English-language films
Films about dogs
Films about fashion in the United Kingdom
Films about kidnapping in the United Kingdom
Films based on children's books
Films directed by Kevin Lima
Films scored by David Newman
Films set in London
Films set in Paris
Films shot in Oxfordshire
Films with screenplays by Bob Tzudiker
Films with screenplays by Noni White
Walt Disney Pictures films
Live-action films based on Disney's animated films
Films produced by Edward S. Feldman
2000s American films